Statistics of Second League of FR Yugoslavia for the 1992–93 season.

Overview
The league was composed of clubs from Serbia and Montenegro after the other former Yugoslav republics became independent and left the league at the end of the 1991–92 Yugoslav Second League.

The champion and the 2 following teams were promoted into the 1993–94 First League of FR Yugoslavia.

At the end of the season FK Jastrebac Niš became champions.

Club names
Some club names were written in a different way in other sources, and that is because some clubs had in their names the sponsorship company included. These cases were:
Jastrebac Niš / Jastrebac Narvik
Rudar Pljevlja / Rudar Volvoks
Borac Čačak / Borac Cane
Obilić / Obilić Kopeneks
Jedinstvo Bijelo Polje / Jedinstvo Tošpred
Radnički Pirot / Radnički Trikom

Final table

References

External sources
 Season tables at FSGZ

Yugoslav Second League seasons
Yugo
2